Semyon Ivanovich Zubakin (born 4 May 1952) was the Head of the Altai Republic in Russia from January 1998 to January 2002 serving one four-year term. In his unsuccessful reelection attempt in 2001, there were many candidates challenging him, and Zubakin received 15% of the vote in the first round, one of the worst showings for an incumbent candidate in world history, though he did take second place and proceeded to a runoff. He was defeated in a landslide by his opponent, Mikhail Lapshin and received only 23% of the vote.

References

1952 births
Living people
People from the Altai Republic
Heads of the Altai Republic
Second convocation members of the State Duma (Russian Federation)